The Fulmar Oilfield is situated 312 km east of Dundee, Scotland, United Kingdom in block number 30/16 and 30/11b. It is operated by Repsol Sinopec who took over from the previous operator, Shell at the end of 2006. At this time Talisman also purchased the equity of the other partners ExxonMobil and Amerada Hess. The field  was discovered in December 1975 by well 30/16-6 in a water depth of 82 metres. Estimated ultimate recovery is 544 million barrels (86.5 m3) of oil. It is named after the fulmar, a sea bird.

The oil reservoir is located at a depth of 3,050 metres.

The "Fulmar A platform" operates above the oilfield. Production started in February 1982 from the Fulmar 'A' platform. This platform is a steel, 8 legged jacket designed by McDermott Engineering and constructed at Nigg, Easter Ross, Scotland. This jacket weighs 12,400 tonnes and supports a topside weight of around 22,560 tonnes. The jacket and platform were installed in July 1979 and June 1980.

Design data for the installations in the Fulmar field is summarized below.

The topsides facilities included capability to drill, produce, meter, pump oil and gas. It can also inject both gas and water. Production is exported via the Norpipe system to Teesside.

Associated natural gas from the reservoir is separated and used to power electrical generation with the excess being transported by the Fulmar Gas Pipeline to St. Fergus.

Previously oil was exported by using an oil tanker anchored to the sea bed. The Medora Floating Storage Offloading (FSO) vessel broke free on the evening of 24 December 1988 narrowly missing the BP operated Clyde platform in the process. 

At that time Fulmar Alpha was host to a BBC crew who, not only, reported on the event but later delivered a live watchnight service broadcast from the platform in memory of the Piper Alpha disaster.  Some of the same BBC crew having come directly from reporting on the Lockerbie disaster.

See also
Energy policy of the United Kingdom
Energy use and conservation in the United Kingdom

References

North Sea oil fields
Oil fields of Scotland
Shell plc oil and gas fields